Data Privacy Lab is a program dedicated to teaching and research in areas related to privacy technology. The Data Privacy Lab in Harvard University is operating in the Institute for Quantitative Social Science (IQSS). Latanya Sweeney founded the Lab and continues as its Director.    The program was first started in 2001 at Carnegie Mellon University in the Heinz College and in 2002, moved to the School of Computer Science, where it operated until 2011 before moving to Harvard. The University of North Carolina at Charlotte is also running a Data Privacy Lab program and it is functioning in the College of Computing and Informatics.

Some of the projects currently underway in the Data Privacy Lab at Harvard School are related to re-identification,  discrimination in online ads, privacy-enhanced linking, fingerprint capture, genomic privacy and complex-care patients.  The Data Privacy Lab at The University of North Carolina at Charlotte conducts research in various areas like privacy preserving data mining, privacy issues in social networks, privacy aware database generation for software testing and privacy and anonymity in data integration and dissemination.

References

Privacy
Anonymity
Harvard University
University of North Carolina at Charlotte